Frank Pereira (born 2 November 1945 in Portugal) is a former Portuguese born South African football midfielder and was a part of the 1981 quadruple winning Kaizer Chiefs.

Early life
Pereira grew up on a farm where he eventually gained skills from playing with the black labourers' kids. People at his school wanted him to play rugby but he loved soccer and he was heavily criticised for playing the black man's sport.

Club career
At the age of 24, Pereira won the 1969 NFL Footballer of the Year award.

At Cape Town City he was the team's top goalscorer in 1973 and 1974 and helped them win the NFL, UTC Bowl and the Champion of Champions.

He joined Chiefs in 1979 as the third white player in their history. Pereira was later converted into a sweeper and was part of the legendary Glamour Boys side that won the quadruple in 1981 before retiring in 1983 with a 276-goal tally.

Manager
Pereira coached Benoni United where he discovered Roger de Sa before joining Orlando Pirates on 29 April 1986 after Pirates poor prior run of two wins in 11 matches.

Personal life
Pereira has been married three times. His second wife died in a car accident. He is currently married to his third wife, Helena. He was named Jingles when he played for Stewarts & Lloyds when he was 10 years old because he always had two pennies in his pocket
as his good-luck charm. The pennies tinkled in his pocket as he ran
on the field and one senior player, Bobby Farrel said: 'Go on Jingle Bells, go on.'"

After retirement
He is the owner of Riverside Distributors with his four brothers-in-law in downtown Johannesburg. His company produces products such as kitchen towels, serviettes, garage rolls and the etc.

References

1945 births
Living people
Portuguese emigrants to South Africa
South African soccer players
Association football midfielders
Jewish Guild players
Kaizer Chiefs F.C. players
Cape Town City F.C. (NFL) players
South African businesspeople
National Football League (South Africa) players